Dartut-e Movvali (also Romanized as Dārtūt-e Movvālī) is a village in Jeygaran Rural District, Ozgoleh District, Salas-e Babajani County, Kermanshah Province, Iran. At the 2006 census, its population was 153, in 27 families.

References 

Populated places in Salas-e Babajani County